Thin Black Duke is the seventh studio album by American experimental rock band Oxbow. It was released on May 5, 2017 through Hydra Head Records.

Background and composition
According to Pitchfork writer Zoe Camp, the album "envision[s] a world domineered by disorder, a carnivalesque arena where music's most intimidating, grandiose genres (free jazz, high-concept chamber pop, noise, neoclassical, metal) can duke it out like gladiators one minute, and come together for a grotesque group hug the next."

Critical reception

Thin Black Duke was met with critical acclaim. The album received an average score of 87/100 from 9 reviews on Metacritic, indicating "universal acclaim". In a positive review with The Quietus, Sean Guthrie wrote, "By rights no group should be peaking after 30 years of making music together, yet that is the situation in which Oxbow find themselves. Will they ever transcend Thin Black Duke? Such are the ideas and attention to detail on this record, only a fool would bet against them." Zoe Camp of Pitchfork was positive on the album, but she did not see Thin Black Duke as Oxbow's "definitive show of force".

Accolades

Track listing

Personnel
Credits adapted from liner notes.

Oxbow
 Dan Adams – bass
 Greg Davis – drums, percussion
 Eugene Robinson – vocals
 Niko Wenner – guitars, vocals, keyboards, composition, arrangement, production

Additional musicians
 Philippe Thiphaine – additional guitars (1, 2)
 Kyle Bruckmann – oboe (4, 7, and 8)
 Oxbow Orchestra Eternal – 16-part brass and strings ensemble
 Marco d'Ambrosio – orchestra conductor

Technical personnel
 Aaron Turner – artwork, design
 Joe Chiccarelli – engineering, mixing, production
 Scott Bergstrom – second engineer 
 Monte Vallier (with Ruminator Audio) – additional engineering, song arrangement consultation 
 John Golden (with Golden Mastering) – vinyl mastering
 Emily Lazar (with The Lodge) – digital mastering

References

Oxbow (band) albums
Experimental rock albums by American artists
Albums produced by Joe Chiccarelli